

Heinrich Burchard (5 October 1894 – 11 April 1945) was a general in the Luftwaffe of Nazi Germany during World War II who commanded several flak divisions.  Burchard committed suicide on 11 April 1945.

Awards and decorations

 Knight's Cross of the Iron Cross on 31 October 1944 as Generalleutnant and commander of the 7. Flak-Division

Notes

References

Citations

Bibliography

 

1894 births
1945 deaths
People from Fulda
Luftwaffe World War II generals
German Army personnel of World War I
People from Hesse-Nassau
Recipients of the clasp to the Iron Cross, 1st class
Recipients of the Knight's Cross of the Iron Cross
German military personnel who committed suicide
Prussian Army personnel
Reichswehr personnel
Generals of Anti-aircraft Artillery
Military personnel from Hesse
Recipients of the Silver Medal of Military Valor